H. David Dalquist (May 25, 1918 – January 2, 2005) was an American inventor and chemical engineer.

Dalquist was a graduate of the University of Minnesota. Dalquist served as a radar technician in the Pacific with the United States Navy during World War II. In 1948, Dalquist and his wife, Dorothy, purchased Northland Aluminum Products and began manufacturing bake ware under the Nordic Ware name. Initially Nordic Ware's product line were all designed to make Scandinavian specialty items including Rosette, Krumkake,  Platte Panne and Ebelskiver.

In the early 1950s, Dalquist designed the Bundt cake pan. Bundt cakes became very popular after the Tunnel of Fudge cake recipe took second place at the 1966 Pillsbury Bake-Off. Dalquist subsequently licensed the name to Pillsbury for use in their cake mixes.  He later helped develop thermoset plastics used in microwave cookware.

References

External links
 Nordic Ware website
 History of the Bundt Pan and Recipe for the Tunnel of Fudge Cake at The American Table
 

1918 births
2005 deaths
American chemical engineers
University of Minnesota alumni
Burials at Lakewood Cemetery
American people of Swedish descent
20th-century American engineers
20th-century American inventors
United States Navy personnel of World War II